Eddie Mininfield, known professionally as Eddie M, is a saxophonist who was born and raised in Berkeley, California. He began playing at seven years old.

He has recorded and performed with Prince & the Revolution, Sheila E., Jill Jones, Beyoncé, Paula Abdul and Stevie Nicks, among others. In addition to his studio work, Eddie M has toured with Yolanda Adams, Wayman Tisdale and Acoustic Alchemy. He was a member of the house band on The Magic Hour.

Eddie M's solo releases include  Hold Me (1997), Ward Street (1998), and Eddie M. (2001) which features Eric Benét and Karyn White.

Discography 
 Merry Arizona 97: Desert Stars Shine at Christmas (1997)
 Eddie M & Blueshound (2003)

External links

References 

American jazz saxophonists
American male saxophonists
Acoustic Alchemy members
Musicians from Berkeley, California
Year of birth missing (living people)
Living people
21st-century American saxophonists
Jazz musicians from California
21st-century American male musicians
American male jazz musicians